The 2007 Nordic Trophy was an ice hockey tournament played between August 9, 2007, and September 8, 2007. The final weekend was played in Helsinki, Finland, at the Helsinki Ice Hall. Oulun Kärpät won the final over Frölunda HC.

Standings

Game log
All times local

Round 1

Round 2

Round 3

Round 4

Round 5

Round 6

Round 7

Finals

7th prize

5th prize

3rd prize

1st prize

Final ranking
1.  Oulun Kärpät
2.  Frölunda HC
3:  Färjestad BK
4:  Tappara
5:  TPS
6:  Linköpings HC
7:  Djurgårdens IF
8:  HIFK

Individual honours
After every game in the Nordic Trophy, three players get Most Valuable Player (MVP) honors called RBK Nordic Stars. The player who has collected most stars prior to the final round is awarded the RBK Nordic Star Award as the tournaments MVP. Awards are also presented to best defenceman, forward, and goaltender, voted by the directors of the Nordic Trophy.
RBK Nordic Star 2007
Tomi Kallio, Frölunda HC

Best defenceman
Lee Sweatt, TPSBest forward
Niklas Andersson, Frölunda HC

Best goaltender
Tuomas Tarkki, Oulun Kärpät

References
stats.swehockey.se/ – Official statistics

Footnotes

External links
www.nordictrophy.com/ – Official site

Nordic Trophy
Nordic
Nordic